The Lost Regiment is a series of science fiction novels written by William R. Forstchen.

Plot
The plot revolves around a Union Army regiment and an artillery battery from the American Civil War which get transported to an alien world. The 35th Maine Infantry regiment and the 44th New York Light Artillery battery travel to a different world using a ship that emerged from a mysterious electrical storm. The alien world is populated by descendants of medieval Russians (or "Rus") who still live a feudal existence at a medieval level of technology. They learn from their new hosts that there are various civilizations on this world made up of the descendants of people from various eras of Earth's history.  

The Union soldiers eventually discover a terrible secret their Russian hosts have been keeping from them when the Tugar arrive. The Tugars are ten-foot-tall aliens with a culture and technology similar to that of the Mongol Horde. They ride a never-ending circuit around the planet. They have subjugated the human populations in their territory and used them as food. The Tugars visit each human society once a generation and cull part of the population for food. This culling keeps the humans docile and compliant and the Tugars make sure that none of the human societies become advanced enough to challenge them. The Union men are horrified by this revelation and kill the Tugar advance scouts. In the aftermath, they support a peasant rebellion against the Tugar-appointed lords and begin modernizing Russian society. When the Tugars arrive, they encounter a semi-modern army equipped with cannons and smoothbore muskets. In a hard-fought battle, the humans manage to prevail, weakening the Tugar Horde forever.

The next several books take up the story a few years later. The Russians have begun to explore the possibilities of a union with the Romans who live in the territory next to theirs and who were spared from the Tugar depredation by the Russian victory. Meanwhile, they face a renewed threat from the Merki Horde, members of the same alien race as the Tugars. The Merki make the same circumnavigation of the globe as the Tugars do but in a zone further south. Once the Merki learn of the Tugar horde's weakening, they seek to take advantage of the Russians. Realizing the disastrous effects that would come from an industrialized enemy, they seek to maintain their racial dominance over the humans through the annihilation of those who have learned the secrets of gunpowder and industrialization. The Merki are aided by a group of Union sailors who fled the Tugar war on the ship which brought the 35th Maine and 44th New York to this world. In exchange for their survival, the humans help the Merki develop firearms and other technology. The Merki attack is more successful than the Tugar one and forces the humans to abandon the Russian territory in a scorched earth campaign, but eventually, they win with their use of trains.  

Several years later, the expanding human alliance faces a new threat in the form of the Bantag. The Bantag are a horde from even further south. They are led by a member of their race who arrived from another world that has a late 20th-century level of technology.  This alien, a soldier in his own world, assumes a messianic role among the Bantag and modernizes their society to equal, and even surpass that of the humans. He is familiar with atomic reactors as well as centerfire rifles. The Bantag scavenge engines from decaying cities abandoned by their people millennia ago and use them to power airplanes. The reader learns that the people of the Bantag had once been a technologically advanced star-faring race, visiting many different planets and seeding teleportation devices across them. The Bantag homeworld collapsed in a nuclear war but the teleportation devices remained sporadically active and ended up transporting various humans to the planet Vallenia (the location of the novel), though Vallenia was not the homeworld of the Tugar/Merki/Bantag race. Using their advanced technology, the Bantag attacked the Union (introducing steampunk tanks and 20th-century mortars). However, the humans developed their own flying machines (mainly blimps and early Zeppelins) and formed a counterattack.

The final book in the series, Down to the Sea, takes place a generation after the arrival of the 35th Maine. With the children of the original regiment members reaching adulthood, they face a new threat from across the southern sea, the Kazars, aliens who have an early 20th-century level of technology and who also have a selectively bred slave race of human assassins, called the Shiv.

Titles
Rally Cry (1990)
Union Forever (1991)
Terrible Swift Sword (1992)
Fateful Lightning (1992)
Battle Hymn (1997)
Never Sound Retreat (1998)
A Band of Brothers (1999)
Men of War (1999)
Down to the Sea (2000)

35th Maine
The 35th Regiment, Maine Volunteer Infantry is a fictional volunteer regiment (Maine really raised 32 Infantry regiments) during the American Civil War in William Forstchen's The Lost Regiment series.  (The regiment is based on Joshua Chamberlain's 20th Maine Infantry.)

Before the series Andrew Lawrence Keane is a lieutenant who assumed command when a superior officer was KIA at Antietam. Keane's leadership under the guidance of his sergeant, Hans Schuder, made them ripe for promotion as they progressed through Fredericksburg, Cold Harbor and Gettysburg.

At the start of the series, Keane is promoted to colonel after losing his arm at Gettysburg. Hans Schuder was recently promoted to sergeant major. In the world of Valennia, the 35th becomes essentially a vassal force to Boyar Ivor of the "Rus" people, who appear to be derived from early Russian peoples earlier transported to Valennia. When Ivor is overthrown, it becomes the core of the anti-Tugar resistance, with Keane filling as a military dictator. As time goes on, the men of the 35th are rapidly promoted to fill the officer corps of the Rus Army and train the Rus forces. When all hope seemed lost, the Rus broke ranks in the Tugar War, the 35th reformed and made a desperate last defense.

After the Tugar War, the 35th becomes the most respected regiment, on which the Army of Russia is centered. Analogous to the United States Military Academy at West Point, the 35th is the best that Rus has to offer and provides a place to train new officers for the Army of the Republic. Even some men from the original 35th remain in the regiment when they could otherwise be high-ranking officers.

Men from the original 35th include (in progress):

 Andrew Keane (Colonel)
 Hans Schuder (Sergeant Major)
 Barry (Sergeant)
 Tim Kindred
 Hank Petracci
 Chuck Ferguson
 Gates
 Vincent Hawthorne
 Jim Hinsen
 John Mina
 Emil Weiss (regimental surgeon)

See also

Destroyermen
Ranks of Bronze
The Excalibur Alternative

External links
 

Fictional military organizations
Science fiction book series